In athletics terminology, barnstorming refers to sports teams or individual athletes that travel to various locations, usually small towns, to stage exhibition matches. Barnstorming teams differ from traveling teams in that they operate outside the framework of an established athletic league, while traveling teams are designated by a league, formally or informally, to be a designated visiting team.

Barnstorming allowed athletes to compete in two sports; for example, Goose Reece Tatum played basketball for the Harlem Globetrotters and baseball for a Negro leagues barnstorming team. Some barnstorming teams lack home arenas, while others go on "barnstorming tours" in the off-season.

History
Teams in baseball's Negro leagues often barnstormed before, during, and after their league's regular season. Hall of Fame baseball pitcher Satchel Paige barnstorm toured with Dempsey Hovland's Caribbean Kings. Hovland founded (and owned) several barnstorming teams, including the Texas Cowgirls (1949–1977), the first integrated professional women's basketball team to tour worldwide, and the New York Harlem Queens. The Harlem Globetrotters and Texas Cowgirls shared training camps, seasons, and circuits.

While barnstorming is no longer as popular as it was in the 20th century, some teams such as basketball's Harlem Globetrotters, softball's King and His Court founded by Eddie Feigner and ice hockey's Buffalo Sabres Alumni Hockey Team carry on the tradition. In the 1990s the Colorado Silver Bullets women's baseball team resurrected barnstorming because there was no women's league.

It was very common in the early days of professional American football; for instance, the Los Angeles Wildcats of the first American Football League (AFL) of 1926 played the regular season as a traveling team, then went on a post-season barnstorming tour of Texas and California, with Red Grange and the New York Yankees as the designated opponent for most of these games. NFL teams were also known to barnstorm in small towns against local teams all the way up through World War II.

Several auto racers, most notably Barney Oldfield, staged exhibitions around the United States in the early twentieth century. In 1914 he barnstormed against the aviator Lincoln Beachey at least 35 times.

In rugby union, the Barbarians, an invitation-only team, are famous for having no ground or clubhouse.

Teams
 
American football
 Los Angeles Wildcats
 Tampa Cardinals
Baseball
 Caribbean Kings
 House of David, a baseball team that toured rural United States from the 1920s until the 1950s
 Indianapolis Clowns
 Iowa Colored Cowboys
Basketball
Harlem Globetrotters
Texas Cowgirls
Washington Generals
Cricket
Bunbury Cricket Club
Kaipaki Nation Cricket Club
Ice hockey
Buffalo Sabres Alumni Hockey Team
Flying Fathers
Montreal Canadiens Legends
Rugby union
Barbarian F.C.
Softball
King and His Court

Other
The Lancaster Barnstormers are a professional baseball team based in Lancaster, Pennsylvania. They are a member of the Freedom Division of the Atlantic League of Professional Baseball, and do not engage in actual barnstorming.

In popular culture
 In the 2001 book Danger Boy by Mark London Williams, Barnstormers is a video game the main character plays, in which players choose humans, vampires, zombies, and other creatures to assemble a barnstorming baseball team that travels the country competing against other teams.

References

Further reading 
 

Terminology used in multiple sports
Harlem Globetrotters
Basketball terminology
Baseball terminology
Ice hockey terminology